Andre Snyman (born 6 August 1963) is a South African cricketer. He played in thirteen first-class for Eastern Province between 1985/86 and 1988/89.

See also
 List of Eastern Province representative cricketers

References

External links
 

1963 births
Living people
South African cricketers
Eastern Province cricketers
Cricketers from Port Elizabeth